Secondary data refers to data that is collected by someone other than the primary user. Common sources of secondary data for social science include censuses, information collected by government departments, organizational records and data that was originally collected for other research purposes. Primary data, by contrast, are collected by the investigator conducting the research.

Secondary data analysis can save time that would otherwise be spent collecting data and, particularly in the case of quantitative data, can provide larger and higher-quality databases that would be unfeasible for any individual researcher to collect on their own. In addition, analysts of social and economic change consider secondary data essential, since it is impossible to conduct a new survey that can adequately capture past change and/or developments. However, secondary data analysis can be less useful in marketing research, as data may be outdated or inaccurate.

Sources of secondary data
Secondary data can be obtained from many sources:
 censuses and government departments like housing, social security, electoral statistics, tax records 
 internet searches and libraries  
 GPS and remote sensing
 km progress reports
 journals, newspapers and magazines

Administrative data and census
Government departments and agencies routinely collect information when registering people or carrying out transactions, or for record keeping – usually when delivering a service. This information is called administrative data.

It can include:

 personal information such as names, dates of birth, addresses
 information about schools and educational achievements
 information about health
 information about criminal convictions or prison sentences
 tax records, such as income

A census is the procedure of systematically acquiring and recording information about the members of a given population. It is a regularly occurring and official count of a particular population. It is a type of administrative data, but it is collected for the purpose of research at specific intervals. Most administrative data is collected continuously and for the purpose of delivering a service to the people.

Advantages and disadvantages of secondary data

Secondary data is available from other sources and may already have been used in previous research, making it easier to carry out further research. It is time-saving and cost-efficient: the data was collected by someone other than the researcher. Administrative data and census data may cover both larger and much smaller samples of the population in detail. Information collected by the government will also cover parts of the population that may be less likely to respond to the census (in countries where this is optional).

A clear benefit of using secondary data is that much of the background work needed has already been carried out, such as literature reviews or case studies. The data may have been used in published texts and statistics elsewhere, and the data could already be promoted in the media or bring in useful personal contacts. Secondary data generally have a pre-established degree of validity and reliability which need not be re-examined by the researcher who is re-using such data. Secondary data is key in the concept of data enrichment, which is where datasets from secondary sources are connected to a research dataset to improve its precision by adding key attributes and values.

Secondary data can provide a baseline for primary research to compare the collected primary data results to and it can also be helpful in research design.

However, secondary data can present problems, too. The data may be out of date or inaccurate. If using data collected for different research purposes, it may not cover those samples of the population researchers want to examine, or not in sufficient detail. Administrative data, which is not originally collected for research, may not be available in the usual research formats or may be difficult to get access to.

Secondary analysis or re-use of qualitative data
While 'secondary data' is associated with quantitative databases, analysis focused on verbal or visual materials created for another purpose, is a legitimate avenue for the qualitative researcher. Actually one could go as far as claim that qualitative secondary data analysis “can be understood, not so much as the analysis of pre-existing data; rather as involving a process of re-contextualizing, and re-constructing, data.”

In the analysis of secondary qualitative data, good documentation cannot be underestimated as it provides future researchers with the background and context and allows replication.

References

Sources 

 Novak, Thomas P. (1996). Secondary Data Analysis Lecture Notes. Marketing Research, Vanderbilt University. Available online (telnet):www2000.ogsm.vanderbilt.edu/marketing.research.spring.1996.

Further reading
 Schutt, R.  Investigating the Social World.  Sage Publications, 2006.  p423-426,412-416
 McCaston, M. Katherine. Tips for Collecting, Reviewing, and Analyzing Secondary Data. Partnership & Household Livelihood Security Unit(PHLS), February 1998. https://web.archive.org/web/20070709112209/http://www.livelihoods.org/info/pcdl/docs/work/SL%20Nepal/Reference%20Sheets/Tips%20for%20Using%20Secondary%20Data.doc
 696 Research Methods, Secondary Data Analysis http://www.csulb.edu/~msaintg/ppa696/696scond.htm
 Sundararajan, V.  Ethnicity, discrimination and health outcomes:  a secondary analysis of hospital data from Victoria, Australia.  Diversity in Health and Social Care, 2007.
 Banta, J.E. Substance Abuse and Dependence Treatment in Outpatient Physician Offices, 1997-2004. American Journal of Drug & Alcohol Abuse.vol 33.aug 2007. p583-593.
 Mochmann, Ekkehard.  Data Archiving and the Uses of Secondary Analysis.  Central Archives for Empirical Social Research, University of Cologne.  https://web.archive.org/web/20070612083623/http://www.metadater.org/archiving_and_secondary_analysis.htm
 O'Sullivan, E. & Rassel, G. R.. Research Methods for Public Administrators. 3rd Ed. Longman, 1999. p265,268-269.
 Kelly, M. Primary and Secondary Data. McKinnon Secondary College, 2005. http://www.mckinnonsc.vic.edu.au/vceit/infodata/primarysecondary.htm
 Corti, L. & Bishop, L. (2005) 'Strategies in Teaching Secondary Analysis of Qualitative Data' FQS 6(1) http://www.qualitative-research.net/index.php/fqs/article/view/509

External links
 UK Data Archive: curator of the largest UK collection of digital data in the social sciences and humanities
 Re-using qualitative data
 ESDS Qualidata: access and support for a range of social science qualitative datasets

Library science terminology
Systematic review
Data types